Jim Heffernan is a former NCAA wrestling champion and former wrestling coach at the University of Illinois.

High school career
Heffernan was a two-time OHSAA state champion and three-time state qualifier at St. Edward High School (Lakewood, Ohio). His non-champion qualification saw him finish in 5th place.

College career
At the University of Iowa he was a national champion, a national runner-up, and a four-time All-American.  The national title came in his junior year.

Coaching career
Heffernan spent 19 years as an assistant at the University of Illinois, 2 years at Oregon State University, and 2 years at Lehigh University.

In 1995, 2001, and 2003 he was named national assistant coach of the year.

In 2009, Heffernan became the head wrestling coach at the University of Illinois.

Accolades
1987 University of Iowa male athlete of the year
2006 National Wrestling Hall of Fame
2015 University of Iowa Hall of Fame.

References

Living people
St. Edward High School (Lakewood, Ohio) alumni
American male sport wrestlers
Year of birth missing (living people)